Married to a Stranger is a 1997 American-Canadian made-for-television romantic drama film starring Jaclyn Smith, Robert Clohessy and Kim Coates. It premiered on The Family Channel on September 28, 1997.  It was directed by Sidney J. Furie.

Plot
A middle-aged woman develops amnesia after a blow to the head, and can no longer remember anything that happened since age 16, including her husband and teenage daughter. Meagan has a 16-year-old daughter named Lacey, and has been married for 20 years. Her parents divorced and live in separate places. Meagan lives with her husband David, and daughter, and her mother lives with them. Seeking the help of a psychiatrist tries to discover who she was and is. Meagan had an art scholarship in Paris, France; but never attended college and eloped because she was pregnant. She remembers seeking out colleges to attend and wanted to know why she never went to college.

Meagan can not live with her father because they have the same fights they had when she was sixteen: her music is too loud, he is annoyed with her painting, etc. Meagan returns to her psychiatrist Jesse and expresses the desire to live alone, so he tells her about an apartment his friends owns. Meagan lives alone and starts to paint. Meagan takes a class for painting and she goes on a tutorial  in Italy. Megan must decide to stay with a family who are strangers or to pursue her love of painting in Europe. Meagan and David go on dates to try to reunite, David is jealous over Jesse and blames him for Meagan moving out on her own. Meagan feels trapped and tells David that she must move forward in order to determine if they can resolve their lives together. David gives her the money to "Go forward" with a ticket to Italy. Meagan remembers her marriage with the picture that she painted. She talked about the wedding and how David gave her the night sky as a wedding gift, and picked roses for her to walk down the isle holding as they eloped. She went to Italy while sitting in the airport David shows up because Meagan had bought him back his car with roses on the hood. She decides to not go to Italy. Meagan and David go out and dance under the open sky, and he proposes to her. They get remarried and she asks her father to give her away. Later while speaking with her mother Meagan learns that she and David lost her son, Douglas while on the way to the hospital they had a wreck. The baby died. Everyone is at the wedding, but Meagan is missing, so David knows that she is at the graveyard looking at Douglas' grave. Meagan has fears of what other memories she may remember. David and Meagan chose the face the unknown together and they skip out on their wedding on the motorcycle and the movies ends.

Cast
Jaclyn Smith as Megan Potter
Robert Clohessy as David Potter
Kim Coates as Dr. Jesse Bethan
Ed Lauter as Harry, Megan's Father
Lorena Gale as Jerry, David's Assistant
Katharine Isabelle as Lacey Potter 
Louise Fletcher as Nana, Megan's Mother

Reception
Variety said, "Production as designed by Brian Davie is handsome, and David Geddes’ camerawork catches the Smith beauty and that of the Vancouver locations. Paul Zaza’s score is pretty, but undistinguished."

References

External links
 

1990s American films
1990s Canadian films
1997 television films
1997 films
1997 romantic drama films
ABC Family original films
American drama television films
American romantic drama films
English-language Canadian films
Fictional married couples
Films about marriage
Films directed by Sidney J. Furie
Films scored by Paul Zaza
MTM Enterprises films